Samuel Schmidt (born 9 August 1945) is a South African cricketer. He played in 29 first-class and 9 List A matches from 1968/69 to 1980/81.

References

External links
 

1945 births
Living people
South African cricketers
Border cricketers
Eastern Province cricketers
Cricketers from Port Elizabeth